Virginia Bruce (born Helen Virginia Briggs; September 29, 1910 – February 24, 1982) was an American actress and singer.

Early life
Bruce was born in Minneapolis, Minnesota.  As an infant she moved with her parents, Earil and Margaret Briggs, to Fargo, North Dakota. The city directory of Fargo documents that the Briggs family lived there at 421 14th Street South. After Virginia graduated from Fargo Central High School in 1928, she moved with her family to Los Angeles intending to enroll in the University of California, Los Angeles when a friendly wager sent her seeking film work.

Career
Bruce's first screen work was in 1929 as an extra for Paramount in Why Bring That Up? In 1930, she appeared on Broadway in the musical Smiles at the Ziegfeld Theatre, followed by the Broadway production America's Sweetheart in 1931.

Bruce returned to Hollywood in 1932, where she began work in early August at Metro-Goldwyn-Mayer  on the film Kongo starring Walter Huston. During production on that project, on August 10, she married John Gilbert(her first, his fourth) with whom she recently costarred in Downstairs. The Film Daily reported that the couple's "quick" wedding was held in Gilbert's dressing room on the studio lot. Among the people attending the small ceremony were the head of MGM production Irving Thalberg, who served as the groom's best man; screenwriter Donald Ogden Stewart, whose wife Beatrice acted as matron of honor; MGM art director and set designer Cedric Gibbons; and his wife, actress Dolores del Río.

Bruce retired briefly from acting after the birth of their daughter Susan Ann, although she returned to film appearances after her divorce from Gilbert (caused by his alcoholism) in May 1934. Gilbert died of alcoholism two years later.

Bruce is credited with introducing the Cole Porter standard "I've Got You Under My Skin" in the 1936 film Born to Dance. The same year, she costarred in the MGM musical The Great Ziegfeld. She also performed periodically on radio. In 1949, for example, Bruce starred in Make Believe Town, a 30-minute afternoon drama broadcast daily on CBS Radio.

In the early 1960s, she retired from films but emerged from retirement in 1981 for a final screen appearance, portraying the title character in Madame Wang's, a "bizarre" production directed by Paul Morrissey in association with Andy Warhol.

Personal life

Bruce married American film director J. Walter Ruben in 1937.

Bruce was a Democrat who supported the campaign of Adlai Stevenson during the 1952 presidential election.

Bruce died of cancer at age 71 on February 24, 1982, at the Motion Picture & Television Country House and Hospital in Woodland Hills, California.

Filmography

Partial TV credits

References

 Virginia Bruce: Under My Skin, 2008. (Biography by Scott O'Brien)

External links

 
 
 
 
 Photographs of Virginia Bruce

1910 births
1982 deaths
Ziegfeld girls
American film actresses
American radio actresses
20th-century American memoirists
American women memoirists
American musical theatre actresses
American television actresses
Deaths from cancer in California
Actresses from Minneapolis
Musicians from Minneapolis
Actresses from North Dakota
Traditional pop music singers
20th-century American actresses
20th-century American singers
American United Methodists
California Democrats
Minnesota Democrats
20th-century American women singers
20th-century Methodists